Following are the results of the Planeta Awards 2007.  The Planeta Awards is an annual Peruvian awards ceremony established by Radio Planeta.

Nominees
Winners are in bold text

The Megaplaneta of the Year
 Rihanna featuring Jay-Z - "Umbrella"
 Linkin Park - "What I've Done"
 Thirty Seconds to Mars - "The Kill"
 Fergie - "Big Girls Don't Cry"
 Nickelback - "Rockstar"

Group of the Year
 Linkin Park
 Nickelback
 Fall Out Boy
 Thirty Seconds to Mars
 The Killers

Singer of the Year
 Rihanna
 Avril Lavigne
 Beyoncé
 Pink
 Fergie

Pop/Hip Hop Artist/Band of the Year
 Rihanna
 Gym Class Heroes
 Gwen Stefani
 Beyoncé
 Kanye West
 Kat DeLuna

Rock Artist/Band of the Year
 Nickelback
 Linkin Park
 Fall Out Boy
 Thirty Seconds to Mars
 Evanescence
 My Chemical Romance
 Foo Fighters
 Matchbox 20

New Pop/Hip Hop Artist/Band of the Year
 Mika
 Regina Spektor
 Mutya Buena
 Fergie
 Sean Kingston
 Colbie Caillat

New Artist/Band Rock of the Year
 Kaiser Chiefs
 The Fray
 Plain White T's

Pop/Hip Hop Song of the Year
 Rihanna featuring Jay-Z - "Umbrella"
 Gwen Stefani featuring Akon - "The Sweet Escape"
 Gym Class Heroes - "Cupid's Chokehold"
 Beyoncé - "Irreplaceable"
 Avril Lavigne - "Girlfriend"
 Kat DeLuna featuring Elephant Man - "Whine Up"
 Pink - "Who Knew"

Rock Song of the Year
 Muse - "Starlight"
 Fall Out Boy - "This Ain't a Scene, It's an Arms Race"
 Snow Patrol - "Open Your Eyes"
 Linkin Park - "What I've Done"
 Thirty Seconds to Mars - "The Kill"
 Linkin Park - "Bleed It Out"
 Foo Fighters - "The Pretender"

Ballad of the Year
 Plain White T's - "Hey There Delilah"
 Nickelback - "If Everyone Cared"
 KoЯn con Amy Lee - "Freak On A Leash"
 James Blunt - "1973"
 Avril Lavigne - "When You're Gone"
 Colbie Caillat - "Bubbly"
 The Fray - "How to Save a Life"

Best Male Vocal Interpretation
 Dave Grohl ( Foo Fighters ) - "The Pretender"
 Matt Bellamy ( Muse ) - "Starlight"
 Chad Kroeger ( Nickelback ) - "Rockstar"
 Chester Bennington / Mike Shinoda ( Linkin Park ) - "Bleed It Out"
 Jared Leto ( Thirty Seconds to Mars ) - "The Kill"

Best Female Vocal Interpretation
 Amy Lee ( Evanescence ) - "Sweet Sacrifice"
 Avril Lavigne - "When You're Gone"
 Regina Spektor - "Fidelity"
 Beyoncé - "Irreplaceable"
 Amy Winehouse - "Valerie"

External links
 
 Radio Planeta 107.7

2007 music awards